This section of the Timeline of United States history concerns events from 1950 to 1969.

1950s

Presidency of Harry S. Truman
1950 – Senator Joseph McCarthy gains power, and McCarthyism (1950–1954) begins
1950 – McCarran Internal Security Act
1950 – Korean War begins
1950 – The comic strip Peanuts, by Charles M. Schulz, is first published
1950 – NBC airs Broadway Open House a late-night comedy, variety, talk show through 1951. Hosted by Morey Amsterdam and Jerry Lester and Dagmar, it serves as the prototype for The Tonight Show
1950 – Failed assassination attempt by two Puerto Rican nationals on President Harry S. Truman while the President was living at Blair House.
1951 – 22nd Amendment, establishing term limits for president.
1951 – Mutual Security Act
1951 – General Douglas MacArthur fired by President Truman for comments about using nuclear weapons on China
1951 – The first live transcontinental television broadcast takes place in San Francisco, California from the Japanese Peace Treaty Conference. One month later, the situation comedy I Love Lucy premieres on CBS, sparking the rise of television in the American home and the Golden Age of Television.
1951 – See It Now, an American newsmagazine and documentary series broadcast by CBS from 1951 to 1958.  It was created by Edward R. Murrow and Fred W. Friendly, Murrow being the host of the show.
1951 – The Catcher in the Rye is published by J. D. Salinger and invigorates the rebellious youth of the period, eventually earning the title of a Classic with its profound impact.
1952 – The debut of the Today show on NBC, originally hosted by Dave Garroway is the fourth longest running talk show on television.
1952 – ANZUS Treaty enters into force
1952 – Immigration and Nationality Act
1952 – In the United States presidential election, Dwight D. Eisenhower elected as president, Richard Nixon elected as vice president

Presidency of Dwight D. Eisenhower
1953 – Eisenhower becomes the 34th President and Nixon Vice President
1953 – Rosenbergs executed
1953 – Korean Armistice Agreement
1953 – Shah of Iran returns to power in CIA-orchestrated coup known as Operation Ajax
1954 – The Tournament of Roses Parade becomes the first event nationally televised in color
1954 – Detonation of Castle Bravo, a 15 megaton Hydrogen bomb on Bikini Atoll. 1,000 times more powerful than the Hiroshima and Nagasaki weapons, it vaporized three islands, displaced the islanders and caused long lasting contamination.
1954 – Joseph McCarthy discredited in Army-McCarthy hearings
1954 – Censure or formal disapproval on Senator Joseph McCarthy after the Army-McCarthy hearings. He died three years later in 1957.
1954 – President Eisenhower proposes the Domino theory: If South Vietnam fell to communism, so too would all nations of Southeast Asia, and eventually worldwide.
1954 – First Indochina War ends after the U.S. kept sending aid to the French. France was defeated by Ho Chi Minh and his army at the Battle of Dien Bien Phu. 
1954 – The CIA overthrows Guatemala's  president Jacobo Arbenz Guzmán (Operation PBSuccess)
1954 – Saint Lawrence Seaway Act, permitting the construction of the system of locks, canals and channels that permits ocean-going vessels to travel from the Atlantic Ocean to the North American Great Lakes, is approved
1954 – Brown v. Board of Education, a landmark decision of the Supreme Court, declares state laws establishing separate public schools for black and white students and denying black children equal educational opportunities unconstitutional
1954 – The U.S. becomes a member of the Southeast Asia Treaty Organization (or SEATO) alliance
1954 – Geneva Conference. U.S. rejects the French decision to recognize Communist control of North Vietnam. U.S. increases aid to South Vietnam.
1954 – The People's Republic of China lays siege on Quemoy and Matsu Islands; Eisenhower sends in Navy to demonstrate an invasion of Taiwan would not be permitted
1954 – The Dow Jones Industrial Average closes at an all-time high of 382.74, the first time the Dow has surpassed its peak level reached just before the Wall Street Crash of 1929
1954 – NBC airs The Tonight Show, the first late-night talk show, originally hosted by Steve Allen
1954 – The Democrats retake both houses of Congress in the Midterms. Will keep the Senate until 1981 and the House until 1994. 
1955 – Ray Kroc opens a McDonald's fast food restaurant and, after purchasing the franchise from its original owners, oversees its national (and later, worldwide) expansion
1955 – Murder of Emmett Till
1955 – Rosa Parks remains seated on a bus, the incident which evolves into the Montgomery bus boycott
1955 – AFL and CIO merge in America's largest labor union federation
1955 – Warsaw Pact, which establishes a mutual defense treaty subscribed to by eight communist states in Eastern Europe (including the USSR)
1955 – Disneyland opens at Anaheim, California
1955 – Jonas Salk develops polio vaccine
1955 – Rock and roll music enters the mainstream, with "Rock Around the Clock" by Bill Haley & His Comets becoming the first record to top the Billboard pop charts. Elvis Presley also begins his rise to fame around this same time.
1955 – Actor James Dean is killed in a highway accident 
1956 – The controversial 1956 Sugar Bowl takes place. Georgia's pro segregationist governor publicly threatens Georgia' Tech's president to not allow the game to take place, as students riot.
1956 – President Eisenhower secures passages of Interstate Highway Act, which will construct 41,000 miles (66,000 km) of the Interstate Highway System over a 20-year period
1956 – The U.S. refuses to provide military support the Hungarian Revolution
1956 – Elvis Presley appears on The Ed Sullivan Show for the first time.
1956 – Marilyn Monroe marries playwright Arthur Miller.
1956 – Jackson Pollock dies in a car crash 
1956 – 1956 United States presidential election: Dwight D. Eisenhower is reelected president, Richard Nixon reelected vice president
1956 – "In God We Trust" adopted as national motto
1957 – President Eisenhower and Vice President Nixon begin second terms
1957 – Eisenhower Doctrine, wherein a country could request American economic assistance and/or aid from military forces if it was being threatened by armed aggression from another state
1957 – Civil Rights Act of 1957, primarily a voting rights bill, becomes the first civil rights legislation enacted by Congress since Reconstruction
1957 – Soviets launch Sputnik; "space race" begins
1957 – Shippingport Atomic Power Station, the first commercial nuclear power plant in the U.S., goes into service
1957 – Little Rock, Arkansas school desegregation. Eisenhower recruits the U.S. National Guard to escort the Little Rock Nine
1958 – National Defense Education Act
1958 - The Affluent Society written by John Galbraith
1958 – NASA formed as the U.S. begins ramping up efforts to explore space
1958 – Jack Kilby invents the integrated circuit
1959 – The NBC western Bonanza becomes the first drama to be broadcast in color
1959 – Cuban Revolution
1959 – Landrum–Griffin Act, a labor law that regulates labor unions' internal affairs and their officials' relationships with employers, becomes law
1959 – Buddy Holly, Ritchie Valens, and The Big Bopper are killed in Clear Lake, Iowa in a plane crash.

1960s

1960 – U-2 incident, wherein a CIA U-2 spy plane was shot down while flying a reconnaissance mission over Soviet Union airspace
1960 – Greensboro sit-ins, sparked by four African American college students refusing to move from a segregated lunch counter, and the Nashville sit-ins, spur similar actions and increases sentiment in the Civil Rights Movement.
1960 – Author Harper Lee publishes To Kill A Mockingbird
1960 – Civil Rights Act of 1960, establishing federal inspection of local voter registration polls and penalties for those attempting to obstruct someone's attempt to register to vote or actually vote
1960 – National Front for the Liberation of Vietnam formed
1960 – John Fitzgerald Kennedy defeats vice president under the Eisenhower administration, Republican Richard Milhous Nixon. The campaign included the first televised United States presidential debate. 
1960 – 1960 United States presidential election: John F. Kennedy elected president, Lyndon B. Johnson elected vice president
1961 – US breaks diplomatic relations with Cuba
1961 – Eisenhower gives celebrated "military–industrial complex" farewell address

Presidency of John F. Kennedy
1961 – John F. Kennedy becomes the 35th president, Johnson, vice president. 
1961 – 23rd Amendment, which grants electors to the District of Columbia
1961 – Peace Corps established.
1961 – Alliance for Progress
1961 – Bay of Pigs Invasion
1961 – Alan Shepard pilots the Freedom 7 capsule to become the first American in space
1961 – Trade embargo on Cuba
1961 – Berlin Crisis of 1961
1961 – Vietnam War officially begins with 900 military advisors landing in Saigon
1961 – OPEC (The Organization of Petroleum Exporting Countries) formed
1962 – Trade Expansion Act
1962 – Andy Warhol becomes famous for his Campbell's Soup Cans painting. 
1962 – John Glenn orbits the Earth in Friendship 7, becoming the first American to do so
1962 – Cuban Missile Crisis, the closest nuclear confrontation involving the U.S. and USSR
1962 – Baker v. Carr, enabling federal courts to intervene in and to decide reapportionment cases
1962 – Engel v. Vitale, determines that it is unconstitutional for state officials to compose an official school prayer and require its recitation in public schools
1962 – Students for a Democratic Society (SDS)
1962 – The comic-book superhero Spider-Man debuts in Amazing Fantasy #15 (August 1962) by Marvel Comics.
1962 – Marilyn Monroe dies of apparent acute barbiturate poisoning at 36.
1963 – Bob Dylan and Columbia Records release The Freewheelin' Bob Dylan (his second studio album), which becomes a classic
1963 - Civil rights activist Medgar Evers assassinated outside his home by Byron De La Beckwith
1963 – Atomic Test Ban Treaty
1963 – March on Washington; Martin Luther King Jr. "I Have a Dream" speech
1963 – The Feminine Mystique by Betty Friedan published, sparking the women's liberation movement - 
1963 – Community Mental Health Act signed by Kennedy

Presidency of Lyndon B. Johnson
1963 – Assassination of John F. Kennedy in Dallas; Vice President Lyndon B. Johnson becomes the 36th President.
1963 – The man accused of assassinating President Kennedy, Lee Harvey Oswald, is shot and killed by Dallas nightclub owner Jack Ruby. The assassination marks the first 24-hour coverage of a major news event by the major networks.
1964 - Ghetto riots (1964–1969), beginning with the Harlem riot of 1964
1964 – The Beatles arrive in the U.S., and subsequent appearances on The Ed Sullivan Show, mark the start of the British Invasion (or, an increased number of rock and pop performers from the United Kingdom who became popular around the world, including the U.S.)
1964 – Tonkin Gulf incident; Gulf of Tonkin Resolution
1964 – 24th Amendment, prohibiting both Congress and the states from conditioning the right to vote in federal elections on payment of a poll tax or other types of tax
1964 – President Johnson proposes the Great Society, whose social reforms were aimed at the elimination of poverty and racial injustice. New major spending programs that addressed education, medical care, urban problems, and transportation were launched later in the 1960s.
1964 – Economic Opportunity Act
1964 – Civil Rights Act of 1964, outlawing major forms of legalized discrimination against blacks and women, and ended legalized racial segregation in the United States
1964 – Panama Canal Zone riots
1964 - The Ford Mustang is introduced
1964 – In the election, President Johnson won by one of the largest victories in U.S. history, defeating Arizona Republican Senator Barry Goldwater
1964 – 1964 United States presidential election: Johnson elected president for a full term, Hubert H. Humphrey elected vice president
1965 – President Johnson begins full term, Humphrey becomes Vice President
1965 – President Johnson escalates the United States military involvement in the Vietnam War
1965 – Students for a Democratic Society (SDS) and the Student Nonviolent Coordinating Committee (SNCC), a civil rights activist group, led the first of several anti-war marches in Washington, D.C., with about 25,000 protesters
1965 – President Johnson appoints Thurgood Marshall as the first African-American Supreme Court Justice
1965 – Immigration Act of 1965
1965 – Voting Rights Act
1965 – Medicaid and Medicare enacted
1965 – Higher Education Act of 1965
1965 – Malcolm X an African-American Muslim minister, public speaker, and human rights activist is assassinated in Harlem, New York
1965 – The Watts riots in the Watts neighborhood of Los Angeles, lasts six days and is the first of several major urban riots due to racial issues.
1966 – Department of Housing and Urban Development (HUD) established
1966 – Department of Transportation created
1966 – National Traffic and Motor Vehicle Safety Act
1966 – Miranda v. Arizona established "Miranda rights" for suspects
1966 – Feminist group National Organization for Women (NOW) formed
1966 – The three major American television networks—NBC, CBS and ABC—have full color lineups in their prime-time schedules.
1966 – Heavyweight boxing champion Muhammad Ali (formerly known as Cassius Clay) declared himself a conscientious objector and refused to go to war. In 1967 Ali was sentenced to five years in prison for draft evasion, but his conviction was later overturned on appeal. In addition, he was stripped of his title and banned from professional boxing for more than three years.
1967 – Jack Ruby died of a pulmonary embolism, secondary to bronchogenic carcinoma (lung cancer), on January 3, 1967 at Parkland Hospital, where Oswald had died and where President Kennedy had been pronounced dead after his assassination.
1967 – The first Super Bowl is played, with the Green Bay Packers defeating the Kansas City Chiefs 35–10.
1967 – Detroit race riot precipitates the "Long Hot Summer of 1967", when race riots erupt in 159 cities nationwide.
1967 – The Outsiders published by S.E. Hinton
1967 – Glassboro Summit Conference between U.S. president Lyndon Johnson and Soviet Premier Alexei Kosygin
1967 – The "Summer of Love" embodies the growing counterculture, with the Monterey Pop Festival and Scott McKenzie's "San Francisco (Be Sure to Wear Flowers in Your Hair)" among the highlights.
1967 – 25th Amendment establishes succession to the presidency and procedures for filling a vacancy in the office of the vice president
1967 – American Samoa becomes self-governing under a new constitution
1968 – On March 31, incumbent President Lyndon B. Johnson announces to the nation on television that he will not seek re-election for the Election of 1968. Opposition toward him and the Democratic Party was growing. The escalation of Vietnam was one of these issues.
1968 – Assassination of Martin Luther King Jr.
1968 – The National Front for the Liberation of Vietnam launches the Tet Offensive
1968 – Civil Rights Act of 1968, commonly known as the Fair Housing Act
1968 – New York Senator Robert F. Kennedy is assassinated in Los Angeles, after winning the California primary for the Democratic Party's nomination for president, by Sirhan Sirhan. 
1968 – Police clashes with anti-war protesters in Chicago during the 1968 Democratic National Convention
1968 – U.S. signs Nuclear Non-Proliferation Treaty
1968 – 1968 United States presidential election: Richard Nixon elected president, Spiro T. Agnew elected vice president; Shirley Chisholm becomes first black woman elected to U.S. Congress
1968 – East L.A. walkouts, or Chicano Blowouts
1968 – Apollo 8 and its three-astronaut crew orbit the Moon, Earthrise photograph taken
1968 – Music group Simon and Garfunkel release "Mrs. Robinson" from their album The Graduate.
1968 – President Johnson awards medals of honor to soldiers from Vietnam.

Presidency of Richard M. Nixon
1969 – Nixon becomes the 37th President, Agnew Vice President
1969 – "Vietnamization" begins
1969 – Author Maya Angelou publishes I Know Why The Caged Bird Sings
1969 – Stonewall riots in New York City marks the start of the modern gay rights movement in the U.S.
1969 – Chappaquiddick incident, where Sen. Edward M. Kennedy drives off a bridge on his way home from a party on Chappaquiddick Island, Massachusetts, killing his passenger, Mary Jo Kopechne
1969 – Neil Armstrong and Buzz Aldrin walk on the Moon on the Apollo 11 mission
1969 – The Woodstock Festival in White Lake, New York, becomes an enormously successful musical and cultural gathering; a milestone for the baby-boom generation
1969 – Warren E. Burger appointed Chief Justice of the United States to replace Earl Warren
1969 – U.S. bombs North Vietnamese positions in Cambodia and Laos
1969 – Sesame Street premieres on National Educational Television.
1969 – Secret peace talks with Vietnam begin
1969 - Although 100-1 shots at the beginning of the season, the New York Mets win the World Series.

See also
 History of the United States (1945–1964)
 History of the United States (1964–1980)
 Timeline of 1960s counterculture

References 

 Kutler, Stanley L., ed. Encyclopedia of the United States in the Twentieth Century (4 vol, 1996)
 Morris, Richard, ed. Encyclopedia of American History (7th ed. 1996)
 Schlesinger Jr., Arthur M. The Almanac Of American History (1983)

1950